The 3rd Parachute Division was an elite military unit of Nazi Germany's Luftwaffe that was active during World War II. Its formation began in October 1943 in France near Reims. From February 1944 near Brest. In March 1944 division was reinforced by soldiers from the 3rd Battalion of the 1st Parachute Regiment.

Operational history 
The 3rd Parachute Division was an airborne division which fought during World War II. It was formed during 1943–44 around a cadre consisting of the veteran 3rd Battalion, 1st Parachute Regiment. The Division was well equipped with 930 MG42s. Each company had 20 MG 42s and 43 sub machine guns while a squad had 2 MG42s and 5 sub machine guns.

It arrived in Normandy on 10 June, by truck after a night drive from Brittany. It was at full strength and consisted of young German volunteers, and numbered 15,976 soldiers and officers. Its level of training and excellent weapon systems prompted the commander of the US 29th Infantry Division to remark, "Those Germans are the best damned soldiers I ever saw. They're smart and they don't know what 'fear' means. They come in and they keep coming until they get their job done or you kill 'em."

The division went into combat in June 1944 in Normandy and inflicted heavy losses on the Allied forces opposing them. Nominally, the unit was to be motorised, but by June it still had no more than 40% of its authorised motor transport, even after seizing vehicles from French civilians. This was to have an impact when trying to move the division towards the invasion front.

In August it was near virtually destroyed by mass aerial bombing in the area of Falaise. Formed again in Belgium from replacements from 22nd, 51st, 53rd Luftwaffe Field Regiments. During September 1944 it fought as a part of Kampfgruppe "Becker" in Arnhem area before participating in the Battle of Hürtgen Forest. It surrendered in April 1945 to American troops in Ruhr.

Commanding officers
 Generalmajor Walter Barenthin, 13 September 1943 – 14 February 1944
 Generalleutnant Dipl.Ing. Richard Schimpf, 17 February 1944 – 20 August 1944
 General der Fallschirmtruppe Eugen Meindl (acting), 20 August 1944 – 22 August 1944
 Generalmajor Walter Wadehn, 22 August 1944 – 5 January 1945
 Generalleutnant Dipl.Ing. Richard Schimpf, 6 January 1945 – 1 March 1945
 Oberst Helmut von Hoffmann, 1 March 1945 – 8 March 1945
 Oberst Karl-Heinz Becker, 8 March 1945 – 8 April 1945
 Oberst Hummel, 8 April 1945 – 16 April 1945

Organization in June 1944 
Commander: General Major Schimpf
HQ Staff
 3rd Mortar Battalion
 3rd Anti-Tank Battalion
 3rd Artillery Battalion
 3rd Engineer Battalion
 3rd Signal Battalion
 5th Fallschirmjäger Regiment
 8th Fallschirmjäger Regiment
 9th Fallschirmjäger Regiment
 Supply troops

References

Further reading

 Hans Wijers: Battle of the Bulge, Vol. 3: The 3rd Fallschirmjager Division in Action, December 1944 – January 1945. Stackpole 2014, .

Fallschirmjäger divisions
Military units and formations established in 1943
Military units and formations disestablished in 1945